The 2003 United Nations Climate Change Conference took place between 1–12 December 2003 in Milan, Italy. The conference included the 9th Conference of the Parties (COP9) to the United Nations Framework Convention on Climate Change (UNFCCC). The parties agreed to use the Adaptation Fund established at COP7 in 2001 primarily in supporting developing countries better adapt to climate change. The fund would also be used for capacity-building through technology transfer. At the conference, the parties also agreed to review the first national reports submitted by 110 non-Annex I countries.

21st-century diplomatic conferences (UN)
Diplomatic conferences in Italy
2003
2003
2003 in international relations
2003 in the environment
December 2003 events in Europe
2000s in Milan
2003 in Italy
History of Milan
Events in Milan